Air vice-marshal (AVM) is a two-star air officer rank which originated in and continues to be used by the Royal Air Force. The rank is also used by the air forces of many countries which have historical British influence and it is sometimes used as the English translation of an equivalent rank in countries which have a non-English air force-specific rank structure. 

Air vice-marshal is a two-star rank and has a NATO ranking code of OF-7. It is equivalent to a rear-admiral in the Royal Navy or a major-general in the British Army or the Royal Marines. In other NATO forces, such as the United States Armed Forces and the Canadian Armed Forces, the equivalent two-star rank is major general.

The rank of air vice-marshal is immediately senior to the rank air commodore and immediately subordinate to the rank of air marshal. Since before the Second World War it has been common for air officers commanding RAF groups to hold the rank of air vice-marshal.  In small air forces such as the Royal New Zealand Air Force and the Ghana Air Force, the head of the air force holds the rank of air vice-marshal.

The equivalent rank in the Women's Auxiliary Air Force, Women's Auxiliary Australian Air Force, Women's Royal Air Force (until 1968) and Princess Mary's Royal Air Force Nursing Service (until 1980) was "air chief commandant".

Royal Air Force use and history

Origins
On 1 April 1918, the newly created RAF adopted its officer rank titles from the British Army, with officers at what is now air vice-marshal level holding the rank of major-general. In response to the proposal that the RAF should use its own rank titles, it was suggested that the RAF might use the Royal Navy's officer ranks, with the word "air" inserted before the naval rank title. For example, the rank that later became air vice-marshal would have been air rear-admiral. The Admiralty objected to any use of their rank titles, including this modified form, and so an alternative proposal was put forward: air officer ranks would be based on the term "ardian", which was derived from a combination of the Gaelic words for "chief" (ard) and "bird" (eun), with the term "third ardian" or "squadron ardian" being used for the equivalent to rear admiral and major general. However, air vice-marshal was preferred and was adopted in August 1919. The following officers were the first to be appointed to the rank, and their former service ranks are also shown:

RAF insignia, command flag and star plate

The rank insignia consists of a narrow light blue band (on a slightly wider black band) over a light blue band on a broad black band. This is worn on both the lower sleeves of the dress uniform or on the shoulders of the flying suit or working uniform.

The command flag of an air vice-marshal has two narrow red bands running through the centre.

The vehicle star plate for an air vice-marshal depicts two white stars (air vice-marshal is a two-star rank) on an air force blue background.

, air vice-marshal was the highest uniformed military rank currently held by a woman in the British Armed Forces when Air Vice-Marshal Elaine West was awarded the position in August 2013.

Other air forces

Origins
In 1920, Sir Willoughby Gwatkin, the former Canadian Chief of the General Staff, was granted the rank of air vice-marshal and appointed the inspector-general of the newly established Canadian Air Force. The Australian Air Corps adopted the RAF rank system on 9 November 1920 and this usage was continued by its successor, the Royal Australian Air Force. However, the rank of air vice-marshal was not used by the Australian Armed Forces until 1935 when Richard Williams, the Australian Chief of the Air Staff, was promoted. Margaret Staib of the Royal Australian Air Force served in the rank of air vice-marshal from 2009 to 2012 when she retired from the Australian Defence Force. In the Royal New Zealand Air Force, the rank did not come into use until 1943 when Leonard Isitt was appointed Chief of the Air Staff in succession to a British air commodore who had been on loan service.  In India, Subroto Mukerjee was the first Royal Indian Air Force officer to gain the rank of air vice-marshal. He gained an acting promotion to air vice-marshal on 27 September 1948 and a substantive promotion several months later on 1 February 1949.

Current use

The rank of air vice-marshal is also used by a number of the air forces in the Commonwealth, including the Bangladesh Air Force, Ghana Air Force, Indian Air Force (IAF), Namibian Air Force, Pakistan Air Force (PAF), Royal Australian Air Force (RAAF) and Royal New Zealand Air Force (RNZAF) where it has been the rank held by the Chief of the Air Staff (now known as the Chief of Air Force) since 1943. It is also used in the Egyptian Air Force, Hellenic Air Force, Royal Air Force of Oman, Royal Thai Air Force and the Air Force of Zimbabwe. In the Indonesian Air Force the equivalent rank is marsekal muda (literally "junior marshal") which is usually translated as air vice-marshal in English. Compare this with the next rank up which is "marsekal madya" (literally "middle marshal") which is usually translated as air marshal in English.

Former use
The Royal Canadian Air Force used the rank until the 1968 unification of the Canadian Forces, when army-type rank titles were adopted. Canadian air vice-marshals then became major-generals. In official French Canadian usage, the rank title was vice-maréchal de l'air. The Royal Malaysian Air Force used the rank until the late 1970s when it was replaced with mejar jeneral (major-general) in similar fashion as Canada with army-type ranks.

South Vietnams air force, the Republic of Vietnam Air Force, which existed from 1955 until the North Vietnamese conquest of South Vietnam in 1975, also used the rank.

See also 

 Air force officer rank insignia
 Air vice marshal (Australia)
 British and U.S. military ranks compared
 Comparative military ranks
 RAF officer ranks
 Ranks of the RAAF

References

...

Military ranks of the Commonwealth
Military ranks of Australia
Former military ranks of Canada
Military ranks of the Royal Air Force
Pakistan Air Force ranks
Military ranks of Bangladesh
Military ranks of Sri Lanka
Air force ranks
Vice offices